Katharine Joanna Staples (born 2 November 1965) is a British female former pole vaulter. In 1992, she became the first British woman to vault over three metres. She went on to win the 1993 UK Championships, the AAA Championships three times (1993, 1994, 1996), and the AAA Indoor Championships three times (1994, 1995, 1996), and broke the British record more than 25 times, peaking at 3.90 metres on 26 May 1996 (she cleared an unofficial 3.90 m in June 1995).

She is also known for her role as Zodiac in the ITV series Gladiators, from 1993 to 1996.

Born in Westminster, London, she had a daughter, Gabriella, with fellow Gladiators performer Mark Griffin. She later married Chris Sheasby, an England rugby union international, and the couple had two children, but separated in 2011 and divorced in 2016.

International competitions

References

External links

1965 births
Living people
People from Westminster
Athletes from London
English female pole vaulters
Gladiators (1992 British TV series)